Achyra serrulata is a moth in the family Crambidae. It was described by Turner in 1932. It is found in Australia, where it has been recorded from Western Australia.

References

Moths described in 1932
Moths of Australia
Pyraustinae
Taxa named by Alfred Jefferis Turner